The Tulane virus, scientific name Recovirus A, is a calicivirus isolated from the rhesus monkey. It is the sole member of the Recovirus genus.

References

Caliciviridae